Beverly Bentley (born June 8, 1927) is a Canadian former ice hockey player. He played 618 games as a goalie in the Western Hockey League, playing with the Seattle Bombers, Saskatoon Quakers, Vancouver Canucks, New Westminster Royals, Victoria Cougars, Seattle Totems, and San Francisco Seals. He also played for the Knoxville Knights of the Eastern Hockey League.

He is a nephew of former NHL players Reg, Doug and Max,  and son of  Roy Bentley.

References

External links

1927 births
Living people
Canadian ice hockey goaltenders
Oakland Oaks (PCHL) players